The Utah Jazz are an American professional basketball team based in Salt Lake City. The Jazz compete in the National Basketball Association (NBA) as a member of the league's Western Conference Northwest Division. Since the 1991–92 season, the team has played its home games at Vivint Arena.

The franchise began play as an expansion team in the 1974–75 season as the New Orleans Jazz (as a tribute to New Orleans' history of originating jazz music). The Jazz relocated from New Orleans to Salt Lake City on June 8, 1979.

The Jazz were one of the least successful teams in the league in their early years. Although 10 seasons elapsed before the Jazz qualified for their first playoff appearance in 1984, they did not miss the playoffs again until 2004. During the late 1980s, John Stockton and Karl Malone arose as the franchise players for the team and formed one of the most famed pick and roll duos in NBA history. Led by coach Jerry Sloan, who took over from Frank Layden in 1988, they became one of the powerhouse teams of the 1990s, culminating in two NBA Finals appearances in 1997 and 1998, where they lost both times to the Chicago Bulls, led by Michael Jordan.

Both Stockton and Malone moved on in 2003. After missing the playoffs for three consecutive seasons the Jazz returned to prominence under the on-court leadership of point guard Deron Williams. However, partway through the 2010–11 season, the Jazz began restructuring after Sloan's retirement and Williams' trade to the New Jersey Nets. Quin Snyder was hired as head coach in June 2014. With the development of Rudy Gobert and Donovan Mitchell into All-Stars, the Jazz launched themselves back into title contention, eventually earning the league's best regular season record in the 2020–21 season. However, following disappointing early playoff exits in both 2021 and 2022, the Jazz traded Mitchell and Gobert to the Cleveland Cavaliers and Minnesota Timberwolves, respectively, in the 2022 offseason and entered a new era of rebuilding centered around Lauri Markkanen, who became an All-Star in his first season with the Jazz after being acquired in the Mitchell trade.

Franchise history

1974–1979: Early years in New Orleans with Pete Maravich

On June 7, 1974, the New Orleans Jazz were admitted as an expansion franchise into the National Basketball Association (NBA). Team officials selected the name because of its definition in the dictionary: collective improvisation. The team began its inaugural season in New Orleans in the 1974–75 season. The team's first major move was to trade for star player Pete Maravich (who had played college basketball at LSU) from the Atlanta Hawks for two first-round draft picks, three second-round picks, and one third-round pick over the next three years. Although he was considered one of the most entertaining players in the league and won the scoring championship for the 1976–77 season with 31.1 points per game, the Jazz's best record while in New Orleans was 39–43 in the 1977–78 season. Maravich struggled with knee injuries from that season onward.

Venue issues were a continual problem for the team while it was based in New Orleans. In the Jazz's first season, they played in the Municipal Auditorium and Loyola Field House, where the basketball court was raised so high that the NBA Players Association made the team put a net around the court to prevent players from falling off of the court and into the stands. Later, the Jazz played games in the cavernous Louisiana Superdome, but things were no better, because of high demand for the stadium, onerous lease terms, and Maravich's constant knee problems. They also faced the prospect of spending a whole month on the road each year because of New Orleans' Mardi Gras festivities, similar to the long road trip faced by the San Antonio Spurs each season during their city's rodeo. Years later, founding owner Sam Battistone claimed that there was no contingency plan in case the Jazz had ever qualified for the playoffs. However, the Superdome's manager at the time, Bill Curl, said that the stadium's management always submitted a list of potential playoff dates to the Jazz management, but these letters were never answered.

The Jazz ultimately compiled a win–loss record of 161–249 (.393) in five seasons in New Orleans. After what turned out to be their final season in Louisiana, the Jazz were dealt a further humiliation when the Los Angeles Lakers selected Magic Johnson with the first overall pick in the 1979 NBA draft. The pick would have been the Jazz's had they not traded it to acquire Gail Goodrich two years earlier. Also, the Jazz had given up the rights to Moses Malone in order to regain one of the three first-round picks used for the Goodrich trade; the combination of Johnson and Malone blossoming into Hall of Famers and Goodrich's ineffective, injury-ruined few years in New Orleans made this transaction one of the most lopsided in NBA history.

1979–1984: Moving to Utah and the Frank Layden era
Despite being barely competitive, the Jazz drew well during their first five years. However, by 1979 the franchise was sinking financially. Barry Mendelson, the team's executive vice president for most of the early years, said one factor in the financial trouble was an 11-percent amusement tax, highest in the U.S. at the time. The team also could not attract much local corporate support—an important factor even in those days—or local investors.

Deciding the Jazz were no longer viable in New Orleans, Battistone decided to move elsewhere. After scouting several new homes, he decided on Salt Lake City, even though it was a smaller market. Salt Lake City had previously been home to the Utah Stars of the American Basketball Association (ABA) from 1970 to 1976. The Stars had been extremely popular in the city and had even won an ABA title in their first season after moving from Los Angeles. However, their financial situation deteriorated in their last two seasons, and they were shut down by the league 16 games into the 1975–76 season in December 1975 after missing payroll.  Although Salt Lake City was not known for its jazz culture, the team decided to keep the name, as there was not enough time before the start of the 1979–80 season to receive league approval for a name change. The Jazz also preserved the original Mardi Gras-themed colors: green, purple, and gold. As a result of the move, of the three ABA teams that were left out of the ABA–NBA merger, the erstwhile Utah Stars are the only one to have eventually been replaced by an NBA team.

The Jazz's attendance declined slightly after the team's move from New Orleans to Utah, partly because of a late approval for the move (June 1979) and also poor marketing in the Salt Lake City area. The team's management made the first of several moves in 1979, bringing high-scoring forward Adrian Dantley to Utah in exchange for Spencer Haywood. Dantley averaged 28 points per game during the 1979–80 season, allowing the team to waive Pete Maravich early in the year. The team struggled to a 24–58 mark, but was rewarded with the second overall pick in the 1980 NBA draft, which they used to pick Darrell Griffith of Louisville, another piece of the rebuilding puzzle.

During the 1980–81 NBA season, the Jazz struggled financially as well as on the court. Despite having perennial All-Star Dantley, 20-point-per-game scorer and Rookie of the Year Griffith and emerging point guard Rickey Green, the Jazz were still unable to get above .500, finishing 25–57.

Tom Nissalke departed as coach after the Jazz started the 1981–82 season 8–12, and general manager Frank Layden replaced him. Layden's coaching was not an improvement early on, as the Jazz went 17–45 the rest of that season to finish 25–57.

The 1982 NBA draft saw the Jazz pick Georgia's Dominique Wilkins, though the team would have preferred either James Worthy or Terry Cummings, but those players went 1–2 to the Lakers and Clippers respectively. Utah had been confident that the Lakers would take Wilkins, which would have given them a shot at either of the other top forwards (they favored Cummings over Worthy because Cummings had shown he could play both small and power forward). However, Utah was not aware that the Lakers had researched both Worthy and Wilkins and decided on Worthy out of concern about Wilkins' perceived selfishness. Battistone's continued financial problems, combined with Wilkins making it clear he did not want to play in Utah, resulted in the Jazz sending Wilkins to Atlanta in return for John Drew and Freeman Williams. This trade, even considering the circumstances, turned out to be one of the most one-sided deals in NBA history. Wilkins would go on to a Hall of Fame career, while Drew and Williams would only play a combined four seasons with the Jazz.

In the 1982–83 season, leading scorer Dantley missed 60 of 82 games and newcomer Drew also missed time, playing in only 44 games. The Jazz ended up being led by Griffith (22.2 points per game), Green (14.3 points per game) and Danny Schayes (12.4 points per game). A rookie 7'4" center, Mark Eaton, manned the post. The team finished 30–52, still out of the playoffs, but an improvement over recent years.

During the 1983 NBA draft, the Jazz used their first-round pick, seventh overall, to choose Thurl Bailey, and later took Bob Hansen in the third round, 54th overall.

1983–84 opened as a season of uncertainty. The team was losing money, and management was crafting stunts, such as playing games at the Thomas & Mack Center in Las Vegas, to help the team become more profitable. The team was rumored to be moving as a result of Battistone's cash shortage as well as the fact they were playing in the league's smallest market. However, fortunes on the court improved, with a healthy Dantley, Jeff Wilkins, and rookie Bailey at the forward positions, Eaton and Rich Kelley jointly manning the post, Green and Griffith at the guards, and Drew adding 17 points per game off the bench. They went 45–37 and won the Midwest Division, the first winning season and division championship in team history.

The Jazz advanced to the playoffs, defeating the Denver Nuggets 3–2 in the first round, and moving on to play the Phoenix Suns in the second round. Despite having home court advantage in the best-of-seven series, the Jazz lost to the more experienced Suns, 4–2.

1984–2003: The Malone and Stockton era
Jazz fans were not happy when the team picked an unknown guard in the first round of the 1984 NBA draft, John Stockton. The Jazz fans on hand for the draft party booed the selection.

The 1984–85 season saw the emergence of Mark Eaton as a defensive force. Eaton averaged 5.6 blocks per game (still an NBA single-season record) along with 9.7 points and 11.3 rebounds, and won the NBA Defensive Player of the Year Award. On the downside, John Drew played only 19 games all season, which deprived the team of their high-scoring sixth man. However, the Jazz returned to the playoffs, facing the Houston Rockets and their All-Star centers, Hakeem Olajuwon and Ralph Sampson. The Jazz prevailed in the series, 3–2, and advanced to the second round, losing the series to the high-scoring Denver Nuggets, 4–1.

The team's perennial financial woes and instability were somewhat stabilized during April 1985, when auto dealer Larry H. Miller bought 50 percent of the team from Battistone for $8 million. Battistone had been seeking to move the team.

However, starter Darrell Griffith missed the season with a stress fracture, and the Jazz hovered around .500 most of the year. Adrian Dantley missed the postseason, and the Jazz lost in the first round to the Dallas Mavericks, 3–1.

During the 1986 off-season, Battistone was approached to sell the team to Marv Wolfenson and Harvey Ratner, who would have moved the team to Minneapolis. Larry Miller did not want to sell the team, but because of contractual language in his agreement with Battistone, could have been bought out by the new owners if he had refused to sell. Offers went as high as $28 million (the Jazz were valued at $16 million less than a year earlier when Miller purchased half for $8 million) before Miller stepped in at the last minute, purchasing Battistone's remaining 50 percent for $14 million and keeping the team in Utah. Wolfenson and Ratner later became the founders of the Minnesota Timberwolves expansion franchise which, coincidentally, was almost sold and moved to New Orleans in 1994.

The 1986–87 season was one of change. Adrian Dantley, the team's star player who had carried them through the early years in Utah, was traded to Detroit for Kelly Tripucka, who ended up splitting time with Thurl Bailey. Darrell Griffith, back from injuries that caused him to miss the 1985–86 season, lost his starter spot at guard to Bob Hansen. Stockton warranted more time at the point guard position. Despite all these changes, the team finished 44–38 before losing to the Golden State Warriors in the first round of the playoffs.

For the 1987–88 season, Stockton took over for Rickey Green as the starting point guard, and Malone established himself as one of the better power forwards in the league. The team finished 47–35 and defeated Portland, 3–1, in the first round, earning a second-round matchup with the reigning NBA champions, the Los Angeles Lakers. After Los Angeles took Game 1 at home, the Jazz won Game 2 in Los Angeles, 101–97, and took the lead in the series 2–1 with a Game 3 win in Salt Lake City. The Jazz lost Games 4 and 5, but won Game 6, 108–80, tying the series 3–3. In the decisive Game 7, the Lakers won 109–98.

1988–1990: Arrival of Jerry Sloan

During the 1988–89 season, Frank Layden stepped down as head coach of the Jazz after the first 17 games, and was replaced by Jerry Sloan. The Jazz won 51 games and the Midwest Division championship as they grew better overall. Malone and Stockton, as well as Mark Eaton, were the leaders of the team and also All-Star selections. Eaton won Defensive Player of the Year for the second time, and it appeared the Jazz were ready to take the next step toward contending for an NBA title, after having pushed the Lakers to seven games in the Western Conference semifinals the previous season. However, the second-seeded Jazz were eliminated in the first round in three games by the seventh-seeded Golden State Warriors.

The following year, 1989–90, the Jazz made some changes. Thurl Bailey, who was relied on for 19 points per game the previous season, saw his playing time reduced in favor of rookie Blue Edwards, who played a prominent role with the team. The result was the best win–loss mark in team history, as the Jazz finished , second in the division to the San Antonio Spurs (56–26). Malone had his best season statistically, averaging 31.0 points and 11.1 rebounds. Stockton averaged 17.2 points and 14.5 assists per game, both career highs, with the assist total and average leading the NBA that season. In the playoffs, the Jazz played the Phoenix Suns in the first round, led by All-Stars Tom Chambers and Kevin Johnson. The Suns defeated the Jazz 3 games to 2. Again, the Jazz were left with questions as to how they could do so well in the regular season but fail to advance in the playoffs.

1990–1996: Working toward championship contention
For the 1990–91 season, the Jazz made another move to improve the team by executing a three-way trade that brought shooting guard Jeff Malone to Utah from the Washington Bullets, while Eric Leckner and Bob Hansen were sent from Utah to the Sacramento Kings and Pervis Ellison going from Sacramento to Washington.

The Jazz began the season 22–15 before going 27–8 in January and February, with new addition Jeff Malone averaging 18.6 points, giving them three strong scoring options (Karl Malone, Jeff Malone, and John Stockton – 64.8 of the team's 104 points per game). The Jazz finished 54–28, second in the division to San Antonio by a game, similar to their division finish the prior year. In the playoffs, they met the Phoenix Suns for the second year in a row. Game 1 was a blowout Utah win, in Phoenix, 129–90, which set the tone for the series, as Utah eliminated the Suns 3–1, earning a second-round matchup with the Portland Trail Blazers, the defending Western Conference champions. The Jazz played well, keeping close in most of the games, but lost the series 4–1 to a deeper and more experienced Trail Blazers team.

The 1991–92 season proved to be the most successful in team history to that time. The Jazz moved to the Delta Center, a state-of-the-art arena that featured a seating capacity of 19,911. The new venue was a considerable improvement over the Salt Palace, which seated just over 12,000 and lacked luxury suites and retail space. Early in the year, a trade brought Tyrone Corbin, a tough defensive forward, from Minnesota in exchange for fan-favorite Thurl Bailey.

The Jazz went 55–27 and won the Midwest Division championship for the first time since 1989. In the playoffs, the Jazz defeated the Los Angeles Clippers 3–2 in the first round, then beat the Seattle SuperSonics in the second round, 4–1, to advance to the Western Conference Finals for the first time, where they again faced and lost to Portland, this time 4–2.

The 1992–93 season was a letdown, as the team slumped to 47–35 and third place in the division. The center position, manned by defensive workhorse Mark Eaton for most of the past decade, became suspect as Eaton struggled with injuries and age. The bright spot for the season was the hosting of the NBA All-Star Game and the surrounding events of All-Star Weekend in Salt Lake City. In the playoffs, the Jazz lost to Seattle in the first round, 3–2. During the postseason, the team addressed its struggles at the center position by acquiring Felton Spencer from Minnesota in return for backup center Mike Brown.

During the 1993–94 season, the Jazz traded Jeff Malone to the Philadelphia 76ers for shooting guard Jeff Hornacek. Hornacek meshed well with Stockton, and the Jazz improved to 53–29. In the playoffs, they faced San Antonio in the first round, shutting down NBA scoring leader David Robinson throughout the series. Robinson had averaged 29.8 points on 50 percent shooting during the regular season, numbers that dropped to 20.0 and 41 percent in the series against Utah. The Jazz then fought off a determined Denver Nuggets team 4–3 in the Conference semifinals (almost blowing a 3–0 series lead in the process) to advance to the Western Conference Finals, where they lost to the eventual NBA champion Houston Rockets 4–1.

In the 1994–95 season, the Jazz had significant depth and talent and were expected to make a serious run for the championship. However, they lost starter Spencer 34 games into the season with a ruptured Achilles tendon. Despite this setback, the Jazz finished 60–22 before again losing to Houston in the playoffs, 3–2, in the first round.

Greg Ostertag was added to the team for the 1995–96 season. The Jazz went 55–27, and reached the Conference Finals for the third time in history, nearly overcoming 3–1 series deficit before eventually succumbing to Seattle, 4–3.

1996–1998: Reaching the NBA Finals
In the next two seasons, the Jazz were finally able to capitalize on regular-season success. In 1996–97, the Jazz had the best record in franchise history (64–18), won the Midwest Division and finished with the best record in the Western Conference. The team included Stockton, Malone and Hornacek, as well as Bryon Russell, Antoine Carr, Howard Eisley and Shandon Anderson. Malone won his first NBA MVP award, averaging 27.4 points, 9.9 rebounds and 4.5 assists per game.

The Jazz reached the NBA Finals for the first time after beating the Clippers 3–0, Lakers 4–1 and Rockets 4–2. The Jazz then met Michael Jordan and the Chicago Bulls in the Finals, losing the series 4–2, with the last two games decided in the final seconds (scores of 90–88 and 90–86).

During the off-season, the Jazz made no changes to the roster. As the 1997–98 season neared, they were expected to be contenders for the championship again. However, Stockton suffered a serious knee injury before the season, and missed the first 18 games, in which the Jazz went 11–7.

On February 17, 1998, at the NBA trade deadline, the Jazz consummated a trade with the Orlando Magic, to acquire center Rony Seikaly in an attempt to bolster their center rotation. However, Seikaly refused to report within the mandated 48 hours required by NBA rules. From there, the trade was called off, and the Jazz took Chris Morris & Greg Foster back. Rumors had Seikaly with a serious foot injury; however, Seikaly insisted the Jazz torpedoed the deal and that he wanted to play for them; however, Seikaly's refusal to report effectively killed the deal. After the trade was off, Orlando pivoted and traded Seikaly to the New Jersey Nets, where he would play a total of 18 games over the next 1 1/2 seasons before retiring from the NBA.

The Jazz played better after Stockton returned from his early-season injury. The team went 51–13 over the last 64 games, to finish at 62–20, and won the Midwest Division and received home-court advantage for the playoffs.

In the playoffs, the Jazz beat Houston 3–2, and San Antonio 4–1, to advance to the Western Conference Finals for the third straight year. Utah, with a veteran roster of Stockton, Malone and Hornacek, faced a Los Angeles Lakers team led by superstar Shaquille O'Neal, guards Eddie Jones, Nick Van Exel and a young Kobe Bryant. The Jazz set the tone for the series with a win in Game 1, 112–77. Game 2, a 99–95 Jazz victory, and Games 3 and 4 in Los Angeles were decided by an average of 7.5 points. The Jazz swept the Lakers and earned a second consecutive trip to the NBA Finals.

In the 1998 NBA Finals (again against the Chicago Bulls), the Jazz took Game 1 at home, 88–85 in overtime. However, the Bulls overcame a slow start to win Game 2, 93–88, easily took Game 3, 96–54, and won Game 4, 86–82, to lead the series 3–1. The Jazz fought back and won Game 5 on the road, 83–81, to trail 3–2 in the series, with Game 6 (and a Game 7 if needed) in Salt Lake City. The Jazz held a lead in most of Game 6, but the Bulls rallied, and in the last seconds of the game, Michael Jordan stole the ball from Malone on the final Jazz possession and then made a famous jump shot to win the game, 87–86, and the series for Chicago, 4–2.

1998–2003: Final years of Stockton/Malone

In the 1999 season, shortened to 50 games due to a lockout, the Jazz finished 37–13, tied with the Spurs for the best record in the league. They defeated the Sacramento Kings in five games in the first round of the playoffs. However, they lost in the second round of the playoffs to the Portland Trail Blazers. Despite yet another disappointment, Malone was awarded his second MVP.

During the 1999–2000 season, the Jazz finished 55–27 and won the Midwest Division but again struggled in the postseason, and lost to the Portland Trail Blazers in the second round. In the off-season, Hornacek retired and Howard Eisley was traded in a four-team deal that brought in Donyell Marshall. They selected promising high school basketball star DeShawn Stevenson in the first round of the 2000 NBA draft.

In the 2000–01 season, the Jazz posted a 53–29 record, but lost in the playoffs, surrendering a 2–0 series lead in the first round of the playoffs to the Dallas Mavericks to lose the series 3–2. This was their earliest exit from the playoffs since the 1994–95 season.

In the 2001–02 season, Andrei Kirilenko made his rookie debut, averaging 10.7 points, 4.9 rebounds, and 1.91 blocks per game. The team started the season slowly, with a record of 16–15 over the first two months, and finished 12–13 to go 44–38 overall. They lost to the Sacramento Kings 3–1 in the first round of the playoffs.

Prior to the 2002–03 season, Marshall and Russell moved on to other teams. Matt Harpring was brought over from the Philadelphia 76ers, and took over the starting forward spot next to Malone, averaging 17.6 points and 6.6 rebounds, the best numbers of his career. The Jazz approached 50 wins going into the playoffs, but ended up falling short with a record of 47–35. They faced the Sacramento Kings in the playoffs again, and lost in a five-game first-round series, 4–1.

After the season, the end of an era came as Stockton retired, and Malone left as a free agent to join the Los Angeles Lakers.

2003–2005: Post-Malone/Stockton era
Without Malone and Stockton, the faces of the Jazz franchise, the team lacked foundation as it went into the 2003–04 season. They were expected to finish near the bottom of the NBA by several NBA preview magazines, including Sports Illustrated. The Jazz finished with a 42–40 record. The team featured several unheralded players who emerged as key contributors, including Kirilenko, Raja Bell, and Carlos Arroyo. In particular, Kirilenko demonstrated versatility on both offense and defense and earned a spot in the All-Star Game. The Jazz missed the playoffs by one game to the Denver Nuggets, ending a streak of 20 consecutive seasons in the playoffs. Jerry Sloan finished second in the voting for the NBA Coach of the Year Award, losing to Hubie Brown of the Memphis Grizzlies.

During the off-season, the team made moves to change the roster; they acquired Carlos Boozer and Mehmet Okur as free agents and re-signed Carlos Arroyo and Gordan Giricek to extensions.

The 2004–05 season was marked by injuries, first to Arroyo and Raúl López, and later to Boozer and Kirilenko, which were a large part of the team's fall to the bottom of the division. When healthy, Boozer averaged 17.8 points and 9.0 rebounds in 51 games. The Jazz ended the 2004–05 season 26–56, their worst since the 1981–82 season.

2005–2010: The Williams and Boozer era

In summer 2005, the Jazz continued to change their roster by trading three draft picks to acquire the number 3 overall pick, which they used to select Deron Williams. Other transactions included Raja Bell leaving the team for the Phoenix Suns, the Jazz re-obtaining center Greg Ostertag from the Sacramento Kings, and oft-injured Raúl López being traded to the Memphis Grizzlies.

The 2005–06 season was injury-plagued before it started; Boozer missed the first 49 games and Gordan Giricek and Kirilenko both missed significant time due to injuries. Okur and Kirilenko, however, showed consistently good play, and Williams, despite a mid-season slump, was still an integral piece of the Jazz offense. However, team owner Larry Miller expressed displeasure with the team's effort during the season. The Jazz stayed in the playoff race until the third-to-last game, when they lost to the Dallas Mavericks. The Jazz ended the season 41–41, three games out of the playoffs. Ostertag retired at the end of the season, having spent 10 of his 11 NBA seasons with the Jazz.

In the 2006 NBA draft, the Jazz selected Ronnie Brewer in the first round and in the second round selected Dee Brown and Paul Millsap. Several young players were traded to the Golden State Warriors for Derek Fisher, which give the Jazz frontcourt a veteran point guard. The Jazz were heralded by several major sports websites for drafting well and making good off-season moves.

During the 2006–07 season, the Jazz improved considerably compared to the previous few seasons, finishing with a 51–31 record. Boozer was selected as an All-Star for the first time (though he missed the game due to a minor injury) and center Mehmet Okur was selected to the All-Star game as well. Deron Williams finished third in the league in assists per game with 9.3 (behind Steve Nash and Chris Paul).

The team also developed a deep bench; in the 10 games that Boozer and Okur (the two leading scorers) missed, the team went 8–2. Millsap became a competent backup to Boozer, averaging 8.1 points and 5.6 rebounds while playing just under 21 minutes per game off the bench. Despite the elevated play of the Jazz, Kirilenko had a significant drop in his statistics and seemed to struggle adapting to a reduced role, which eventually led to a well-publicized breakdown early in the first round of the playoffs.

The Jazz faced the Houston Rockets in the first round, a match-up of number 4 and number 5 seeds (Utah was seeded higher due to winning the Northwest Division, but Houston had a 52–30 record opposed to Utah's 51–31, giving them home court advantage in the series). It was a physical, close-fought match-up, with each of the first six games being won by the home team. The Jazz broke this trend in the seventh game, and beat the Rockets 103–99 in Houston. The Jazz went on to face the eighth-seeded Golden State Warriors, who were coming off a historic upset of the number 1-seeded Dallas Mavericks. However, the Jazz easily handled the Warriors, and won the series 4–1. The Jazz then faced the San Antonio Spurs in the Western Conference finals, but lost to the more experienced Spurs, 4 games to 1 in the series. The Spurs eventually won the NBA championship that season by defeating the Cleveland Cavaliers 4 games to 0 in the NBA Finals.

During the off-season, the Jazz gained a hometown NBA Development League affiliate in the Utah Flash (based in Orem), which they shared with the Boston Celtics. They selected Morris Almond in the first round, although ultimately they made few lineup changes. The most significant move was in letting Derek Fisher go. Fisher had become a fan favorite due to his strong play, and also a sympathetic one due to his daughter's well-publicized battle with a rare form of eye cancer. Fisher moved to Los Angeles during the off-season to be closer to better care for his daughter, and later signed with the Los Angeles Lakers. Controversy arose after Kirilenko led his Russian national team to a win in EuroBasket 2007 (the European championship), a tournament in which he was named MVP. After that, Kirilenko posted on a blog that he wished to be traded from the Jazz and would be willing to walk away from his contract. He later reaffirmed this in interviews. However, no trade was made and he remained with the team.

During the 2007–08 season, after a trade that sent Gordan Giricek to the Philadelphia 76ers in exchange for Kyle Korver, the Jazz had a record-tying 19-game home winning streak and improved on the road after a rough December. Despite the off-season controversy and trade talk, Kirilenko elevated his play, improving all stats from the previous season, and seemed content with his new role as a defender and a facilitator as opposed to a scorer. Boozer again was an All-Star selection, while Williams continued to elevate his play. The Jazz finished the regular season fifth-best in the Western Conference with a 54–28 record. The Jazz sold out 46 of 47 home games (including playoffs) during the year, and possessed a 37–4 home regular-season record; that was, however, offset by a sub-par road win–loss record.

The Jazz again faced the Houston Rockets in the first round of the playoffs, this time as a number 4 seed (although the Rockets possessed home-court advantage due to a better record). The Jazz took a 2–0 series lead in Houston, but lost the first game in Salt Lake City. After splitting the next two games, the Jazz beat the Rockets 113–91 in game 6, placing them into a second-round match-up with the number 1 seeded Los Angeles Lakers, their first postseason meeting since the 1998 Western Conference finals. Utah lost games 1 and 2 in Los Angeles. However, the Jazz held up their great home win record and defeated Los Angeles in Games 3 and 4. The Jazz lost game 5 in Los Angeles and were eliminated in Game 6. The Jazz made no major moves during the off-season.

The 2008–09 season was difficult for the Jazz as they struggled with injuries that disrupted team chemistry, and although they were again nearly unstoppable at home, they possessed a poor road record. Utah's top three players all missed significant time due to sickness or injury; Williams missed 13 of the first 15 games, Boozer missed more than half of the season, and Okur missed sporadic time due to both injury and his father's sickness that led him to travel to his native Turkey early in the season. On February 20, 2009, Jazz owner Larry H. Miller died of complications from diabetes. His son, Greg Miller, became the new CEO of the team. The Jazz finished with a 48–34 record, slipping to No. 8 in the competitive Western Conference playoff race, after which they were eliminated by the Los Angeles Lakers for the second year in a row, 4 games to 1.

The season was the last for long-time radio and former TV announcer Hot Rod Hundley, who announced his retirement after being with the Jazz for their entire history (35 years). Despite the disappointment, Williams proved to be one of the elite point guards in the league, averaging 19.4 points and 10.8 assists per game, second in the league, despite playing the entire season with a lingering ankle injury.

During the 2009 NBA draft, the Jazz selected Eric Maynor No. 20 overall to back up Williams. Veteran Matt Harpring retired, citing consistent injuries sustained from his physical playing style. Rumors circulated that Boozer wanted a trade, fueled by whisperings that the Jazz were shopping him after he chose to opt into the last year of his contract; however, the team stated publicly that they did not seek to trade him. Boozer remained with the team heading into the 2009–10 season. The Jazz also added rookie Wesley Matthews to the lineup after an impressive training camp.

As the 2009–10 season began, the Jazz started 19–17. Several trades were made by the team, one that sent Maynor and the contract of the retired Harpring to the Oklahoma City Thunder and another that sent starter Ronnie Brewer to the Memphis Grizzlies at mid-season, a trade which was openly criticized by Williams. The Brewer trade cleared the way for Matthews to take over his starter spot. Also, Williams was selected to play in the All-Star Game for the first time, and after a controversial off-season, Boozer played better than the year prior, averaging 19.5 points and 11.2 rebounds per game, and missed only four games to injury. He suggested that he would be happy to stay with Utah long-term. After returning from an early-season injury, Kyle Korver set the NBA record for three-point field goal percentage in a season.

In a tight Western Conference, the Jazz finished 53–29 and lost the division in a tiebreaker with the Denver Nuggets, ending with the No. 5 seed, matched up with the Nuggets in the first round of the playoffs. Kirilenko, who had missed 13 of the last 15 games of the season due to an injury, re-aggravated the injury the day before the first game of the playoffs and missed the first round, while Okur tore his Achilles tendon in the first game and missed the rest of the playoffs. Despite the injuries, the Jazz played well enough to defeat Denver 4–2 in the series. The Jazz were then eliminated by the Los Angeles Lakers for the third year in a row, being swept 4–0 (the first four-game sweep in Jazz history).

2010–2017: Rebuilding and the post-Jerry Sloan era

2010–2013: Departure of Williams & Boozer, Jefferson/Millsap duo
In the 2010 NBA draft, the Utah Jazz selected Gordon Hayward from Butler University with the No. 9 overall pick, and Jeremy Evans with the No. 55 overall pick.

Boozer agreed to a five-year, $80 million contract with the Chicago Bulls in free agency on July 7, 2010. The Jazz turned the transaction into a sign-and-trade one day later, receiving a trade exception worth around $13 million in return from Chicago. Kyle Korver also agreed to sign with the Bulls, two days later. Terms were not announced, but multiple reports had his deal as three years, $13 million. Wesley Matthews signed a five-year, $33 million offer sheet with the Portland Trail Blazers on July 10, 2010.

Less than a week after the Boozer loss, the Jazz traded Kosta Koufos and two future first-round picks to Minnesota for Al Jefferson, using the trade exception from the Boozer deal to receive Jefferson's contract without exceeding the salary cap. Raja Bell was added also, to provide backcourt help after the losses of Korver and Matthews. He was signed to a three-year, $10 million contract.

On June 15, 2010, the Jazz unveiled a new color scheme and logo, which represented a return to the old 'music note' logo. The team unveiled new uniforms on August 16.

The Jazz tendered restricted free-agent center Kyrylo Fesenko a $1 million qualifying offer in June 2010. The offer entitled Utah to match any offer that Fesenko accepted from another team, whether signed or not. Fesenko signed the offer on September 27, 2010, the day before training camp began. On the eve of training camp, the Jazz added two more players, Francisco Elson and Earl Watson for the 2010–11 season.

The 2010–11 season began on a positive note, as the team went undefeated (8–0) in the preseason, and in mid-January, they were 27–13 and seemed well on their way to another winning season, had that pace continued. However, over the next 14 games, Utah went 4–10. On February 10, 2011, with the team record at 31–23 after a loss to the Chicago Bulls, head coach Jerry Sloan resigned, along with assistant Phil Johnson. Another of Sloan's assistants, Tyrone Corbin, was named the new head coach, while Scott Layden, the other assistant, remained as well. At the time of his departure, Sloan was the longest-tenured coach in the NBA. A week later, the Jazz hired former Jazz player Jeff Hornacek as an assistant coach.

On February 23, 2011, the Jazz traded star player Deron Williams to the New Jersey Nets for players Derrick Favors and Devin Harris, as well as two first-round draft picks (New Jersey's 2011 and Golden State's conditional 2012). It was rumored that Williams got into a shouting match with head coach Sloan during a game against the Chicago Bulls, which preceded Sloan's resignation and eventually, the Jazz's decision to trade Williams.

"And while I never saw any indication that he wouldn’t re-sign with us, I never saw any indication he would", said Miller. The remainder of the season saw the Jazz continue to struggle, finishing with a 39–43 record, 11th in the Western Conference, therefore missing the playoffs for the first time since 2006.

During the 2011 draft, the Jazz had two top 14 picks (one acquired in the trade that sent Williams to the New Jersey Nets), and used them on Enes Kanter and Alec Burks. Following the end of the 2011 NBA lockout that saw the 2011–12 season shortened to 66 games, the Jazz bid farewell to their two longest-tenured players – Mehmet Okur was traded to the Nets for a future second-round pick, and Andrei Kirilenko, who played in his native Russia during the lockout and whose contract had expired after the 2011 season, decided to stay in Russia for the remainder of the 2011–12 season. They also acquired free agent veterans Josh Howard and Jamaal Tinsley.

During the 2012 off-season, the Jazz traded Devin Harris to the Hawks for Marvin Williams.

In the 2012 draft, the Jazz selected Kevin Murphy with the No. 47 overall pick. The Jazz signed Mo Williams and Randy Foye, both former Clippers, and re-signed Jeremy Evans and Tinsley during the off-season. Long-time Jazz player C. J. Miles decided to sign with Cleveland. Andrei Kirilenko did not re-sign with the Jazz in the off-season. The Jazz also named Dennis Lindsey as general manager and Kevin O'Connor as vice president of basketball operations.

Longtime assistant coach Scott Layden left Utah to be a part of the San Antonio Spurs front office.

Before the 2013–14 season began, Utah did not retain either Paul Millsap or Al Jefferson. Millsap accepted a two-year offer to join the Atlanta Hawks, while Jefferson signed with the Charlotte Bobcats. Jeff Hornacek was hired during the off-season as head coach of the Phoenix Suns. On March 14, 2014, the Jazz were officially eliminated from playoff contention with a 96–87 loss to the Los Angeles Clippers.

2013–2017: Hayward/Gobert era
On June 27, 2013, Rudy Gobert was selected with the 27th overall pick in the 2013 NBA draft by the Denver Nuggets. He was later traded on draft night to the Utah Jazz. On July 6, he signed his rookie scale contract with the Jazz and joined them for the 2013 NBA Summer League.

On May 20, 2014, the Jazz earned the 5th pick in the 2014 NBA draft at the NBA Draft Lottery, with which they chose 18-year-old Australian point guard Dante Exum. They also had the 23rd pick from a trade with the Golden State Warriors and their own pick in the second round (the 35th pick overall). With the 23rd pick they selected Rodney Hood from Duke University. The 35th pick was used to select Jarnell Stokes, who was subsequently traded to the Memphis Grizzlies for a future second-round pick.

On June 6, 2014, Atlanta Hawks assistant coach Quin Snyder was named the eighth head coach in team history. Snyder signed a three-year contract with a team option for a fourth. He replaced Tyrone Corbin. Prior to joining the Utah Jazz, Snyder previously served as an NBA assistant coach for the Atlanta Hawks, Los Angeles Clippers, Philadelphia 76ers, and Los Angeles Lakers.

The Jazz ended the 2015–16 season with a win–loss record of 40–42, good for ninth place in the Western Conference; however, the team failed to qualify to play in the NBA Playoffs by one game.

The Jazz finished 51–31 during the 2016–17 season and qualified to play in the NBA Playoffs as the Western Conference's fifth seed. They defeated the Los Angeles Clippers in seven games in the first round for the team's first playoff series win since 2010. The team advanced to play the defending Western Conference champion Golden State Warriors in the conference semifinals where they were swept 4–0, ending their season. Gordon Hayward and Rudy Gobert had breakout seasons in 2017. After putting together several solid seasons in prior years, Hayward was named an NBA All-Star, while Gobert was named to the NBA Defensive First Team and All NBA Second Team.

Hayward left the Jazz to sign with the Boston Celtics as a free agent on July 4, 2017, announcing his decision in a letter published by The Players' Tribune. Hayward's contract was finalized on July 14, 2017.

2017–2022: The Gobert and Mitchell era

2017: Donovan Mitchell arrives

On June 22, 2017, Donovan Mitchell was selected with the 13th overall pick in the 2017 NBA draft by the Denver Nuggets, who immediately traded Mitchell's rights to the Jazz in exchange for Trey Lyles. The Jazz also acquired veteran Ricky Rubio to play the point guard position.

The Jazz began the 2017–18 season poorly, with an injury to Gobert and a lack of scoring leaving them with a 17–21 record by the end of December. In the second half of the season, the Jazz made rookie Mitchell a starter, and he subsequently led the team and all rookies in the league in points scored. Mitchell went on to break the record for the most three-pointers ever made by a rookie. The team improved drastically as a scoring team, and with the return of Gobert and improved play of Rubio, the Jazz finished the season on a 32–13 run and ended with a 48–34 record. The late-season burst earned the Jazz a no. 5 seed in the 2018 NBA playoffs, where they went on to beat the Oklahoma City Thunder 4–2 in the first round before losing in the Second Round to the Houston Rockets in five games. After the season, Rudy Gobert was named NBA Defensive Player of the Year, Donovan Mitchell was runner-up in the Rookie of the Year voting, Quin Snyder was runner-up Coach of the Year, and general manager Dennis Lindsey was runner-up Executive of the Year.

2018–2020: Regular season success; playoff disappointment
The 2018–19 season began with promise for the Jazz after the surprising success of the 2017–18 season. However, by the end of November they were 11–12 and in 10th place in the Western Conference standings. This continued in December as Mitchell struggled with his shot, and the Jazz record continued to be around the break-even mark.

However, in the New Year, Mitchell's performance improve as he was averaging 27.7 points in January and 25.4 in February, and the Jazz improved down the stretch, closing out the season with a 32–13 run to finish 50–32 and earned the fifth seed in the Western Conference playoffs. In the first round, they played against the Houston Rockets, who were on a run of their own, going 33–14 in 2019 after a slow start. Houston proved to be too much for the Jazz, taking the series 4–1.

On May 10, 2019, the Jazz announced the promotion of Dennis Lindsey to executive vice president of basketball operations and Justin Zanik to general manager.

During the 2019 off-season, the Jazz added several players by trade and free agency, including Jeff Green, Mike Conley Jr., Ed Davis, Bojan Bogdanović, and Emmanuel Mudiay, while Derrick Favors, Kyle Korver, Jae Crowder, Raul Neto, and Ricky Rubio left the team. Sports media viewed the changes as positive.

On the opening day of the 2019–20 season, a press conference was held, announcing that Utah would host the 2023 NBA All-Star Game. This would be the second time the Jazz hosted this event; the first was in 1993.

On December 24, 2019, the Jazz announced that they had waived forward Jeff Green, signed G-League free agent Rayjon Tucker, and traded Dante Exum to the Cleveland Cavaliers for shooting guard Jordan Clarkson, whose trade in particular was seen as overwhelmingly positive by the media, if also bittersweet for Jazz fans who hoped that Exum would eventually mature into the franchise cornerstone he was drafted to be.

On January 30, 2020, Gobert and Mitchell were named reserves for the 2020 NBA All-Star Game. This marked the first time since 2007 that multiple Utah Jazz players had been selected to the All-Star game, and the first time since 2000 that multiple Jazz players had actually appeared in the game (Mehmet Okur had replaced an injured Carlos Boozer in 2007). In March 2020, Gobert and Mitchell were diagnosed with COVID-19, making the Jazz the first major sporting franchise in North America to be directly affected by the disease, and resulting in the suspension of all remaining NBA games of the season.

Following the suspension of the 2019–20 NBA season, the Jazz were one of the 22 teams invited to the NBA Bubble to participate in the final eight games of the regular season. The Jazz were mediocre in the eight seeding games, posting a 3–5 record. However, this allowed them to lock up the Western Conference sixth seed and a favorable matchup with the Denver Nuggets. In game 1, Donovan Mitchell achieved the third-highest single-game scoring total in playoff history (behind only Michael Jordan and Elgin Baylor) with 57 points, but the Jazz lost to the Nuggets in overtime. Mitchell's brilliant play continued through the series as the Jazz won the next three games, two of them by lopsided margins; however, they blew their 3-1 lead and lost at the buzzer in game 7 of the series.

Within hours of the Jazz's playoff loss, Mitchell agreed to a five-year, $195 million contract extension that would keep him in Utah. On December 20, 2020, Rudy Gobert signed a five-year, $205 million contract extension, the third-largest contract in NBA history and the largest ever for a center. During the 2020 off-season, the Jazz traded away backup centers Tony Bradley and Ed Davis, re-signed Jordan Clarkson to a four-year, $51.52 million contract, and re-acquired Derrick Favors from the Pelicans to serve as a more reliable post presence off the bench. In the 2020 NBA draft, the Jazz selected Kansas center Udoka Azubuike 27th overall in the first round and Syracuse forward Elijah Hughes 39th overall in the second round.

2020–2021: Three NBA All-Stars; playoff contention
On October 28, 2020, the Utah Jazz organization announced that Ryan Smith, a Utah native and the billionaire co-founder of Qualtrics, had purchased the team from the Miller family. Smith agreed at the time of the sale to honor the terms of the legacy trust into which the Millers had placed the Jazz organization, including the provision requiring the team to be kept in Utah. On April 16, 2021, the Jazz announced that Dwyane Wade had purchased a minority ownership stake in the team and was expected to have hands-on involvement in team operations.

The Jazz began their 2020–21 season with an NBA-best and franchise-record 23–5 start, with Donovan Mitchell leading the team in scoring and Jordan Clarkson emerging as the frontrunner for Sixth Man of the Year. On February 17, 2021, head coach Quin Snyder was announced as the head coach of the Western Conference team for the 2021 NBA All-Star Game, becoming the first Jazz coach so honored since Frank Layden in 1984. On February 23, Donovan Mitchell and Rudy Gobert were announced as All-Star reserves for the second consecutive season, with Mitchell also slated to compete in the three-point contest. On March 5, Mike Conley was selected as an All-Star reserve for the first time in his career, replacing the injured Devin Booker. Conley was also announced as Booker's replacement in the three-point contest. This marked the second time in franchise history (the first being 1989 with John Stockton, Karl Malone, and Mark Eaton) that three Jazz players had been selected as All-Stars.

On February 24, 2021, former Jazz forward Elijah Millsap alleged via Twitter that Dennis Lindsey (then the team's general manager) had made a racist remark to him during an interview in 2015. Both Lindsey and Quin Snyder, who was present for the conversation, adamantly denied the allegations. The Jazz subsequently announced that independent counsel had been retained by the organization to investigate whether the allegations were true. On March 16, the NBA announced that this investigation had concluded that there was no proof Lindsey had made the comments, citing the fact that nobody associated with the meeting could corroborate Millsap's story (including Millsap's own agent, who confirmed that Millsap had never mentioned the incident to him at the time). The Jazz organization subsequently cleared Lindsey of any wrongdoing.

On May 16, 2021, the Jazz defeated the Sacramento Kings 121–99 to clinch sole possession of the best regular season record in the NBA for the first time in franchise history (the Jazz had tied for the best record in 1998 and 1999). At the conclusion of the regular season, Jordan Clarkson was named Sixth Man of the Year, becoming the first Jazz player to win the award and winning over his own teammate, Joe Ingles, who was runner-up.

In the first round of the 2021 NBA playoffs, the Jazz played the eighth-seeded Memphis Grizzlies.  After losing game 1 in a surprising home upset with Donovan Mitchell held out due to lingering injury concerns, the Jazz won the next four games to advance to the Western Conference semifinals. Mitchell shot an impressive 11-16 from the field during game 5, scoring 30 points and recording 10 assists  to help the Jazz seal the series. In the second round, the Jazz played the fourth-seeded Los Angeles Clippers. Despite winning the first two games at home, the Jazz were eliminated from the playoffs after the Clippers won the next four games.

The Jazz regressed somewhat during the 2021-22 season; while Mitchell and Gobert were once again named All-Stars, the team did not have the same regular season success. Still, the Jazz posted a 49-33 record and made the playoffs as a 5th seed. In the first round, they faced the Dallas Mavericks. After winning game 1 in Dallas, the Jazz struggled and lost the series 4-2.

2022–present: The Lauri Markkanen era

2022: Departure of Gobert and Mitchell
On July 1, 2022, the Jazz traded three-time NBA Defensive Player of the Year Award winner Rudy Gobert to the Minnesota Timberwolves in exchange for Malik Beasley, Patrick Beverley, Jarred Vanderbilt, Leandro Bolmaro, Walker Kessler (the 22nd selection in the 2022 NBA draft), four future first round draft picks, and a pick swap. On August 25, 2022, Beverley was traded to the Los Angeles Lakers in exchange for Stanley Johnson and Talen Horton-Tucker. On September 1, 2022, the Jazz traded three-time All-Star guard Donovan Mitchell to the Cleveland Cavaliers in exchange for Collin Sexton, Lauri Markkanen, Ochai Agbaji (the Cavaliers' top selection and the 14th pick in the 2022 NBA Draft), three future unprotected first-round draft picks, and two pick swaps.

On June 5, 2022, Quin Snyder announced his resignation as head coach of the Jazz. On June 29, the Jazz organization announced that Boston Celtics assistant coach Will Hardy had been hired as Snyder's replacement.

On February 2, 2023, Lauri Markkanen was selected to appear as a reserve in the 2023 NBA All-Star Game, his first career All-Star selection. On February 10, it was further announced that Markkanen had been selected as an All-Star starter as a result of injuries to Stephen Curry and Zion Williamson. Markkanen also participated in the Three-Point Contest during All-Star weekend. In addition, the Jazz fielded a three-player team of Collin Sexton, Walker Kessler, and Jordan Clarkson in the NBA's re-formatted team skills challenge. The three Jazzmen ultimately won the event.

On February 8, 2023, the Jazz traded Malik Beasley and Jarred Vanderbilt to the Los Angeles Lakers and Mike Conley Jr., Nickeil Alexander-Walker, and two future second-round picks to the Minnesota Timberwolves as part of a three-team trade. In return, the Jazz received Russell Westbrook, Juan Toscano-Anderson, and Damian Jones along with the Lakers' 2027 first-round pick. The Jazz subsequently negotiated a buyout of Westbrook's contract and waived him, allowing him to sign with the Los Angeles Clippers.

Rivalries

The Jazz have not historically had a natural or fierce rival where each team has been competitive with the other over a long period of time. However, the Jazz have played several teams more than once in the NBA playoffs.

The Jazz have played the Houston Rockets eight times in the playoffs with the Jazz winning the series five times. The Rockets won NBA championships in 1994 and 1995, defeating the Jazz in the Western Conference Finals and the first round, respectively. The Portland Trail Blazers advanced to the 1992 NBA Finals after defeating the Jazz, while the Seattle SuperSonics did the same in 1996. The San Antonio Spurs won an NBA championship in 2007 after defeating the Jazz in the Conference Finals, while Utah advanced to the 1998 NBA Finals after defeating San Antonio in the Conference Semifinals.

Utah advanced to the NBA Finals both times that the Jazz defeated the Los Angeles Lakers in the playoffs, while the Lakers have advanced to the Finals each year they defeated Utah in either First Round or Conference Semifinals, winning NBA championships in 1988, 2009, and 2010. During the 2012–13 season, the Jazz and the Lakers competed for the eighth seed in the Western Conference, but the Jazz did not qualify for the 2013 NBA playoffs.

The Jazz also have a regional rivalry with the Denver Nuggets. Both teams are geographically situated in the Rocky Mountains, and have been part of the same division since 1979, having moved to the Northwest Division for the 2004–05 season.  This rivalry was dramatically intensified by the brilliant first-round playoff series between the teams in 2020, during which Donovan Mitchell and Jamal Murray each recorded multiple 50-point games and the Nuggets overcame a 3-1 deficit to advance.

Utah had a brief but consequential rivalry with the Chicago Bulls in the late 1990s, when the two teams faced off in the 1997 and 1998 Finals. Facing Michael Jordan, the Jazz lost 4-2 in both series.

Season-by-season record
List of the last five seasons completed by the Jazz. For the full season-by-season history, see List of Utah Jazz seasons.

The Jazz are the only team in the NBA history to have never lost 60 or more games in a season. This distinction was achieved when the New York Knicks and the Los Angeles Lakers both lost more than 60 games in the 2014–15 season.

Note: GP = Games played, W = Wins, L = Losses, W–L% = Winning percentage

Arenas
 Loyola Field House (1974–1975)
 Municipal Auditorium (1974–1975)
 Louisiana Superdome (1975–1979)
 Salt Palace (1979–1991)
 Vivint Arena (formerly known as the Delta Center and Energy Solutions Arena) (1991–present)

Mascot

Jazz Bear is the club's mascot. He was introduced to the league on November 4, 1994. Jazz Bear usually excites the crowd during halftime by coming onto the court on a motorbike.

Logos and uniforms

New Orleans Jazz

During the Jazz's time in New Orleans from 1974 to 1979, the home uniform was white with gold trim, a purple "Jazz" script and purple numbers. The road uniform was purple with gold trim, a white "Jazz" script and white numbers. The franchise's original colors of purple gold, and green are those most associated with Mardi Gras in New Orleans.

Utah Jazz

When the team moved to Utah in 1979, the Jazz made slight changes to their uniforms. The home uniforms remained the same, with the word "Utah" added to the center chest logo in the 1986–87 season. In 1981, the road uniforms were changed to dark green, with the aforementioned Jazz logo on the center chest and gold numbers. For the 1984–85 season, they were changed back to purple, this time with gold numbers and white trim, along with the addition of the word 'Utah' on the logo. These uniforms were worn until the 1995–96 season. The green jerseys were worn for St. Patrick's Day in the 1985–86 season.

For the 1996–97 season, the Jazz drastically updated their logos and uniforms, with a new color scheme of purple (slightly lighter from the previous shade), copper and turquoise. The logo, designed by former NBA creative director Tom O'Grady, was based on the 1993 All-Star Game logo. Their new uniform set featured a silhouette of the Wasatch Range on the center chest, with a stylish new Jazz script, and purple and turquoise details. On the road purple jersey, the white mountain range gradually fades to purple just above the numbers, which are white, with copper interior trim and teal outlining. On the home white jersey, the numbers are purple, with white interior trim and teal outlining. The Jazz wore these uniforms until the 2003–04 season.

The Jazz also introduced an alternate black uniform in the 1998–99 season, with the Jazz script on the center chest, but without the Wasatch Range silhouette. On this jersey, both the Jazz script and numbers are white, with purple interior trim and copper outlining, and copper side panels. This uniform was worn until the 2003–04 season.

In the 2004–05 season, the Jazz once again updated their color scheme, logos and uniforms. The new color scheme, which the team used until the end of the 2009–10 season, consisted of navy blue, powder blue, silver and purple, though the latter color was only used on the primary and alternate logos. The team logo remained substantially the same, with the exception of the new color variation. The new home uniform consisted of an updated "Jazz" script on the center chest in navy blue, with navy numbers, both of which had silver interior trim and powder blue outlining. The new road uniform was navy blue, with a "Utah" script in powder blue on the center chest and powder blue numbers, both of which had silver outlining and white interior trim.

In the 2006–07 season, the Jazz introduced a new alternate powder blue uniform. This uniform, which the team wore until the end of the 2009–10 season, featured a Jazz script identical to the team logo and navy blue numbers below the script, also with silver and white trim. The nameplate on the back of the jersey was navy blue.

The team's original 'J-note' logo was revived in the 2008–09 season, but was only used on television broadcasts and in the team's then-current colors.

On June 15, 2010, the Jazz unveiled a new logo and color scheme on the team's official website. For the 2010–11 season, the Jazz kept the mountain logo as the primary logo, but in a new color scheme of navy blue, gold, dark green & gray, though the latter color was dropped after the 2015–16 season. The 'J-note' logo returned to its original green-and-gold scheme, but the navy blue was retained. The new uniform set, which was unveiled on August 16, features a design nearly identical to the team's aforementioned 1970s uniform designs, with the following differences: navy blue replacing purple on the road uniform, dark green numerals on the home white jerseys, a V-neck on both the home and road jerseys and side panels on both the home and away jerseys. The new uniforms were a combination of both the old and new styles, with navy blue retained from the most recent color scheme, but the now-famous 'J-note' logo and gold and green were revived.

The Jazz unveiled an alternate jersey on December 9, 2011, that is similar to their road jersey, but swaps the navy and green colors so that the primary color is green, with a navy stripe on the side. This uniform was worn until the 2015–16 season.

On May 12, 2016, the Jazz updated their logos and uniforms. The team selected its wordmark logo as its new primary logo, with the addition of the word 'Utah' above the two Z's; because of that, the team discontinued the use of the mountain logo, which had been used since 1996. A new home court design was also unveiled. Home and road uniform modifications included the creation of a new, custom number font. To go along with the new look, two new alternate uniforms were introduced: a modified green alternate, with a "Utah" script arched in white, and a new navy sleeved alternate featuring the white 'J-note' logo on the right breast and numbers on the left breast in gold, with green, gold and white stripes below the chest.

In 2017, as part of the switch to Nike as the NBA's uniform provider, the Jazz made some slight changes to their uniform set. While the white "Association" and navy "Icon" uniforms remained mostly intact, the Jazz retired their green and navy sleeved alternates in favor of a gold "Statement" uniform, featuring the navy 'J-note' logo and green numbers. The "City" uniform was inspired from the red rock formations found in Southern Utah, and it featured a gradient of gold, orange, burgundy and black. After a three-season run, the Jazz replaced their original "City" uniform with a similar design, but with the gradient reversed so that it fades to black. NBA guidelines require a new "City" uniform to be released every one to three years.

Also part of the Nike rotation is the "Earned" uniform, which is given only to teams who qualified in the NBA playoffs the previous season. The "Earned" uniform, however, is only used in select seasons, unlike the other uniforms. The 2019 version mirrored that of the "Statement" uniform except with a dark green base and lack of navy elements. The 2021 version was similar but with a light Kelly green base (a nod to the early 1980s green uniforms) and different striping patterns.

The Jazz unveiled new uniforms before the 2022–23 season. As part of the transition, the team brought back the classic 1996–2004 purple "mountain" uniforms as the "City" uniform, along with "Statement" black, "Icon" yellow and "Association" white uniforms. The white uniform features only the J-note logo and numbers in black, the yellow uniform has "Jazz" and numbers in black, and the black uniform has "Utah" and numbers in yellow. Starting with the 2023–24 season, the Jazz announced in advance on social media that a "remixed" version of the "mountain" uniforms would replace the classic 1996–2004 version; this design features updated mountain gradients, an enlarged "Utah" wordmark in front, and white numbers positioned on the left chest.

Throwback uniforms
The Jazz have worn the original J-note uniforms on three separate occasions. During the 2003–04 season, the Jazz commemorated the team's 25th season in Utah by donning replicas of the 1986–96 white uniforms. Then in the 2009–10 season, the Jazz wore the 1979–1984 green uniforms (albeit with white trim and letters) to pay tribute to the 30th anniversary of the aforementioned move to Utah.

For the 2018–19 season, the Jazz wore a modernized version of their 1984–1996 purple uniforms to mark the team's 40th season in Utah.

For the 2019–20 season, the Jazz wore a modernized version of their 1996–2004 purple uniforms. The team wore these uniform designs during its two trips to the NBA Finals in 1997 and 1998. The Jazz brought such uniforms back for the 2022–23 season but treated as a "City" uniform, due to the fact that it bore the current Nike swoosh logo whereas other "Classic" edition uniforms bore the classic wordmark-and-swoosh logo beginning in 2021.

For the 2024–25 season, the Jazz announced that they would wear the original 1974–75 purple uniforms as part of the franchise's 50th anniversary and as part of its #PurpleIsBack marketing campaign.

Players

Current roster

Retained draft rights
The Jazz hold the draft rights to the following unsigned draft picks who have been playing outside the NBA. A drafted player, either an international draftee or a college draftee, who is not signed by the team that drafted him, is allowed to sign with any non-NBA teams. In this case, the team retains the player's draft rights in the NBA until one year after the player's contract with the non-NBA team ends. This list includes draft rights that were acquired from trades with other teams.

Retired numbers

 The NBA retired Bill Russell's No. 6 for all its member teams on August 11, 2022.

Basketball Hall of Famers

Notes:
 1 In total, Bellamy was inducted into the Hall of Fame twice – as player and as a member of the 1960 Olympic team.
 2 In total, Stockton was inducted into the Hall of Fame twice – as player and as a member of the 1992 Olympic team.
 3 In total, Malone was inducted into the Hall of Fame twice – as player and as a member of the 1992 Olympic team.

FIBA Hall of Fame

Franchise leaders
Bold denotes still active with team.
"Name*" includes points scored for the team while in the ABA.
Italics denotes still active but not with team.

Points scored (regular season) (as of the end of the 2021–22 season)

 Karl Malone (36,374)
 John Stockton (19,711)
 Adrian Dantley (13,635)
 Darrell Griffith (12,391)
 Thurl Bailey (9,897)
 Andrei Kirilenko (8,411)
 Pete Maravich (8,324)
 Donovan Mitchell (8,234)
 Gordon Hayward (8,077)
 Rudy Gobert (7,592)
 Deron Williams (7,576)
 Derrick Favors (7,336)
 Mehmet Okur (7,255)
 Rickey Green (6,917)
 Jeff Hornacek (6,848)
 Carlos Boozer (6,821)
 Paul Millsap (6,713)
 Bryon Russell (5,752)
 Matt Harpring (5,640)
 Mark Eaton (5,216)
 Jeff Malone (5,158)
 Joe Ingles (5,094)
 Al Jefferson (4,089)
 Rich Kelley (4,044)
 Aaron James (3,829)
 Bojan Bogdanović (3,748)
 Alec Burks (3,671)
 Bob Hansen (3,550)
 Jeff Wilkins (3,445)
 Greg Ostertag (3,425)

Other statistics (regular season) (as of the end of the 2021–22 season)

Individual awards

NBA MVP
Karl Malone – 1997, 1999

NBA Rookie of the Year
Darrell Griffith – 1981

NBA Defensive Player of the Year
Mark Eaton – 1985, 1989
Rudy Gobert – 2018, 2019, 2021

NBA Sixth Man of the Year
Jordan Clarkson – 2021

NBA Coach of the Year
Frank Layden – 1984

NBA Executive of the Year
Frank Layden – 1984

J. Walter Kennedy Citizenship Award
Frank Layden - 1984
Thurl Bailey - 1989

All-NBA First Team
Pete Maravich – 1976, 1977
Karl Malone – 1989, 1990, 1991, 1992, 1993, 1994, 1995, 1996, 1997, 1998, 1999
John Stockton – 1994, 1995

All-NBA Second Team
Pete Maravich – 1978
Adrian Dantley – 1981, 1984
Karl Malone – 1988, 2000
John Stockton – 1988, 1989, 1990, 1992, 1993, 1996
Deron Williams – 2008, 2010
Rudy Gobert – 2017

All-NBA Third Team
John Stockton – 1991, 1997, 1999
Karl Malone – 2001
Carlos Boozer – 2008
Rudy Gobert – 2019, 2020, 2021

NBA All-Defensive First Team
E. C. Coleman – 1977
Mark Eaton – 1985, 1986, 1989
Karl Malone – 1997, 1998, 1999
Andrei Kirilenko – 2006
Rudy Gobert – 2017, 2018, 2019, 2020, 2021, 2022

NBA All-Defensive Second Team
Mark Eaton – 1987, 1988
Karl Malone – 1988
John Stockton – 1989, 1991, 1992, 1995, 1997
Andrei Kirilenko – 2004, 2005

NBA All-Rookie First Team
Darrell Griffith – 1981
Thurl Bailey – 1984
Karl Malone – 1986
Andrei Kirilenko – 2002
Deron Williams – 2006
Trey Burke – 2014
Donovan Mitchell – 2018

NBA All-Rookie Second Team
Blue Edwards – 1990
Paul Millsap – 2007
Derrick Favors – 2011

NBA All-Star Weekend
NBA All-Star Selections
Pete Maravich – 1977, 1978, 1979
Truck Robinson – 1978
Adrian Dantley – 1980, 1981, 1982, 1984, 1985, 1986
Rickey Green – 1984
Karl Malone – 1988, 1989, 1990, 1991, 1992, 1993, 1994, 1995, 1996, 1997, 1998, 2000, 2001, 2002
John Stockton – 1989, 1990, 1991, 1992, 1993, 1994, 1995, 1996, 1997, 2000
Mark Eaton – 1989
Andrei Kirilenko – 2004
Carlos Boozer – 2007, 2008
Mehmet Okur – 2007
Deron Williams – 2010, 2011
Gordon Hayward – 2017
Rudy Gobert – 2020, 2021, 2022
Donovan Mitchell  – 2020, 2021, 2022
Mike Conley Jr.  – 2021
Lauri Markkanen  – 2023

NBA All-Star Game MVP
Karl Malone – 1989, 1993
John Stockton – 1993

NBA All-Star Game head coaches
 Frank Layden – 1984
 Quin Snyder – 2021

Broadcasters

The Jazz's flagship radio stations are KZNS (1280) "The Zone" and KZNS-FM Fox Sports Radio 97.5.

The Jazz signed a new exclusive 12-year agreement with then FSN Utah, (now part of AT&T SportsNet Rocky Mountain) on October 20, 2009, ending the team's broadcasts on KJZZ-TV. A one year extension was signed during the 2020 offseason.

The team's current TV and radio announcers are:

 Craig Bolerjack (TV play-by-play)
 Holly Rowe (TV color commentary)
 Thurl Bailey (TV color commentary)
 Alema Harrington (TV host, pre-game and post-game)
 Michael Smith (TV broadcast analyst)
 David Locke (radio play-by-play)
 Ron Boone (radio broadcast analyst)
 Dan Roberts (public address announcer, home games)
 Nelson Moran (Spanish Radio: play-by-play/color commentary) 
 Isidro Lopez (Spanish Radio: play-by-play)
 Nicole Hernandez (Spanish Radio: color commentary/sideline reporter)

Retired announcers:
 Rod Hundley (TV and Radio play-by-play) (1974–2009)

Head coaches

References

External links

 

 
National Basketball Association teams
Jazz
Sports in Salt Lake City
Basketball teams established in 1974
1974 establishments in Louisiana
Relocated National Basketball Association teams
Jazz